Cuffe is a surname. Notable people with the surname include:

Charles Cuffe (1914–1972), Irish cricketer
Ciarán Cuffe (born 1963), Irish Green Party politician
Ellen Cuffe, Countess of Desart (1857–1933), Irish politician and company director
 Francis Cuffe (died 1694), Irish politician, MP for Mayo 1692–93
 Francis Cuffe (died 1717), Irish politician, MP for Mayo 1715–17
 Gerald Cuffe (1669 – after 1715), Irish politician, MP for Castlebar 1703–14
Hamilton Cuffe, 5th Earl of Desart, KP, KCB, PC (1848–1934), British peer and solicitor
Henry Cuffe (1563–1601), English author and politician, executed during the reign of Queen Elizabeth I of England for treason
James Cuffe, 1st Baron Tyrawley (1747–1821), Irish peer and politician
James Cuffe (died 1678) (died 1678), Irish politician
James Cuffe (died 1762) (1707–1762), of Elmhall and Ballinrobe, was an Irish landowner in County Mayo
James Cuffe (died 1828) (1778–1828), Irish MP, elected to the Irish House of Commons for Tulsk in 1800
John Cuffe (1880–1931), Australian-born English cricketer and footballer
John Cuffe, 3rd Earl of Desart (1818–1865), Irish Conservative politician
Lady Charlotte Wheeler Cuffe (née Williams) (1867–1967), Irish botanic artist and collector
Michael Cuffe (1694–1744), Irish Member of Parliament
Mike Cuffe, Republican member of the Montana Legislature
Nikita Cuffe, Australian water polo player
Selena Cuffe, née Saunders (born 1975), African-American businesswoman
William Cuffe, 4th Earl of Desart (1845–1898), Writer and Irish peer

See also
Cuffe Parade, upmarket neighbourhood in South Mumbai
Paul Cuffe Farm, National Historic Landmark on 1504 Drift Road in Westport, Massachusetts
Wheeler-Cuffe baronets, a title in the Baronetage of Ireland
Cuff (disambiguation)
Cuff, extra layer of fabric at the lower edge of the sleeve of a garment
Cuff (surname), with list of people with surname 'Cuff'
Kuffs, 1992 comedy film directed by Bruce A. Evans and produced by Raynold Gideon